Trinity College is a private liberal arts college in Hartford, Connecticut. Founded as Washington College in 1823, it is the second-oldest college in the state of Connecticut.

Coeducational since 1969, the college enrolls 2,235 students.  Trinity offers 41 majors and 28 interdisciplinary minors. The college is a member of the New England Small College Athletic Conference (NESCAC).

History

Early history 

Bishop Thomas Brownell opened Washington College in 1824 to nine male students

The site next to Bushnell Park, where Trinity College then stood, was deemed an ideal location for building a statehouse. So the trustees were persuaded to sell the entire campus to the city in 1872 for $600,000.  The trustees moved the college to an 80-acre site on a ridge on the western edge of Hartford. Then-president Abner Jackson hired an English architect to draw up plans for an entire campus. Construction of the new campus was begun under the presidency of Thomas Ruggles Pynchon (1874–1883).

New campus 

In 1872, Trinity College was persuaded by the state to move from its downtown "College Hill" location (now Capitol Hill, site of the state capitol building) to its current  campus a mile southwest. Although the college sold its land overlooking the Park River and Bushnell Park in 1872, it did not complete its move to its Gallows Hill campus until 1878.  The original plans for the Gallows Hill site were drawn by the noted Victorian architect William Burges but were too ambitious and too expensive to be fully realized. Only one section of the proposed campus plan — the Long Walk— was completed.

By 1889 the library contained 30,000 volumes, and the school boasted over 900 graduates. Enrollment reached 122 in 1892. President Remsen Ogilby (1920–43) enlarged the campus, and more than doubled the endowment. The faculty grew from 25 to 62, and the student body from 167 to 530 men. Under President Keith Funston (1943–51), returning veterans expanded the enrollment to 900.

Twentieth century 
Trinity ended the nineteenth century as an institution primarily serving the Hartford area. The early years of the century were primarily growth years for Trinity. Enrollment was increased to 500 men.

In 1932, under President Remsen Ogilby, the Gothic chapel was completed and became the symbol of Trinity College. It replaced the Seabury chapel which had become too small for the student body.

The founding of the University of Hartford in 1957 allowed Trinity to focus on becoming a regional institution rather than a local one. Trinity has recently installed a plaque commemorating the "University of Hartford" name.

In 1962, Connecticut Public Television (CPTV) began its first broadcasts in the Trinity College Public Library, and later in Boardman Hall, a science building on campus.

In 1968, the trustees voted to withdraw from the Association of Episcopal Colleges.

Also in 1968, the trustees of Trinity College voted to make a commitment to enroll more minority students, providing financial aid as needed. This decision was preceded by a siege of the administrative offices in the Downes and Williams Memorial buildings during which Trinity students would not allow the president or trustees to leave until they agreed to the resolution.

Less than one year later, Trinity College became coeducational and admitted its first female students, as transfers from Vassar College and Smith College. Today, women make up about 50 percent of Trinity's student body.

Academic regalia

Trinity followed the European pattern of using academic regalia from its foundation, and was one of only four US institutions (all associated with the Episcopal Church) to assign gowns and hoods for its degrees in 1883. There were six degrees awarded at the time, all taking a black gown of silk or stuff and a hood of black silk lined according to the degree: BA white silk, MA dove-colored silk, BD crimson silk, DD scarlet silk, LLD pink silk, MusD purple silk.

In 1894, a year before the introduction of the intercollegiate code on academic costume, the college brought in a new scheme of academic regalia. The hoods and gowns followed the shape of those used at the University of Oxford except that the hood for Doctors of Divinity was of the shape used at the University of Cambridge. A variety of different colours and fabrics were used for the hoods: BA black stuff edged palatinate purple, BS black stuff edged light blue silk, BLitt black stuff edged russet brown silk, BD black silk edged scarlet silk (not in use by 1957), LLB black silk edged dark blue silk (not in use by 1957), MusB black silk edged pink silk (not in use by 1957), MA black silk lined palatinate purple silk, MS black stuff lined light blue silk, DD scarlet cloth lined black silk, DLitt scarlet silk-lined russet brown silk, LLD scarlet silk lined dark blue silk, DCL crimson silk lined black silk, MusD white silk-lined pink silk, DSc black silk lined light blue silk, PhD black silk lined people silk (not in use by 1957), MD scarlet silk lined maroon silk (not in use by 1957). To this were added DPH black cloth lined salmon pink silk (1945), DHLitt scarlet silk-lined people silk (1947), DHum white silk-lined crimson (1957), and DST scarlet silk-lined blue with a gold chevron (1957). As of 2018, the hoods for doctorates (except the PhD and MD) and for the MMus remain in use for honorary degrees, with the further addition since 1957 of the DFA wrote lined white with a red Chevron.

Academics 

Trinity offers three degrees: the B.A., B.S., and M.A. (in a few subjects). The college offers 41 majors, as well as the options of creating a self-designed major or adding an interdisciplinary or departmental minor. Trinity is part of a small group of liberal arts schools that offer degrees in engineering. Trinity has a student-to-faculty ratio of 9:1. Its most popular undergraduate majors, by number out of 517 graduates in 2022, were:
Political Science and Government (80)
Economics (64)
Psychology (41)
Econometrics and Quantitative Economics (38)
Engineering (28)
Neuroscience (24)
Biology/Biological Sciences (23)

Trinity College, Rome Campus 
Trinity College, Rome Campus (TCRC), is a study abroad campus of Trinity College. It was established in 1970 and is in a residential area of Rome on the Aventine Hill close to the Basilica of Santa Sabina within the precincts of a convent run by an order of nuns.

Admissions 

The 2020 annual ranking by U.S. News & World Report categorizes Trinity as "more selective".

For the Class of 2022 (enrolling fall 2018), Trinity received 6,096 applications, accepted 2,045 (33.5%) and enrolled 579.

As of fall 2015, Trinity College does not require the SAT or ACT for students applying for admission.  Of the 31% of enrolled freshmen submitting SAT scores, the middle 50% range was 630–710 for evidence-based reading and writing, and 670–750 for math, while of the 23% of enrolled freshmen submitting ACT results, the middle 50% range for the composite score was 29–32.

Rankings and reputation 

Trinity is known as one of the Little Ivies. In 2022, Forbes magazine ranked Trinity College 12th amongst all liberal arts universities and 62nd amongst all colleges and universities. U.S. News & World Report ranked Trinity 39th in its 2022 ranking of best national liberal arts colleges in the United States. It was also ranked 46th for best value school. However, these US News rankings likely reflect that Trinity joined the "Annapolis Group" in August 2007, an organization of more than 100 of the nation's liberal arts schools, in refusing to participate in the magazine's rankings. Trinity College is accredited by the New England Commission of Higher Education.

In 2016, authors Howard and Matthew Greene continued to include Trinity in the third edition of Hidden Ivies: 63 Top Colleges that Rival the Ivy League. In addition, The Princeton Review has given Trinity a 93 (out of 99) for selectivity and in 2017 named Trinity as a best value college. Money.com magazine ranked Trinity College 55th among all colleges and universities in the nation.

Student life

Traditions

The bantam 

Trinity's mascot, the bantam, was conceived by Joseph Buffington, class of 1875, who was a federal judge and trustee of the college.

Alma mater 

Trinity's alma mater is "Neath the Elms." It was written in 1882 by Trinity student Augustus P. Burgwin to the tune of a song that his butler often sang. When "Neath the Elms" was written, the college had been planting elm trees on the quad, which remain today.

Student publications 
 The Trinity Tripod

Athletics 

The Trinity College Department of Athletics currently sponsors a wide range of sports.

Fraternities and sororities 

Officially, approximately 18% of the student body are affiliated with a Greek organization.  They operate under guidelines and regulations established and enforced by the Trinity College.

In 2012, then-president James F. Jones proposed a social policy for Trinity College which made a commitment, among other things, to require all sororities and fraternities to achieve gender parity within two years (i.e., for each sorority and fraternity to have an equal number of male and female members) or face closure. Trinity College's co-ed mandate for fraternities and sororities was withdrawn in September 2015 and replaced with the "Campaign for Community" effort to establish more inclusive social traditions on campus.

Trinity currently has the following sororities and fraternities:

 Alpha Chi Omega (A Chi O)was founded as the Order of the Elms in October 2016. Received affiliation with the NPC in May 2017.
 Alpha Chi Rho (Crow) was founded at Trinity College in 1895
 Alpha Delta Phi (Alpha Delt)
 Alpha Epsilon Pi (AEPi) Tau Beta Chapter
 Alpha Kappa Alpha (AKA) 
 Cleo of Alpha Chi (Cleo)
 The IVY Society (IVY)
 Kappa Kappa Gamma (Kappa)
 Kappa Sigma (Kappa Sig)
 Lambda Alpha Upsilon (ΛΑΥ)
 Lambda Pi Upsilon (Lambda Divas)
 Pi Kappa Alpha (Pike)
 Psi Upsilon (Psi U)
 St. Anthony Hall  (The Hall or St. A's)
 The Stella Society: founded at Trinity College in 2017
 Zeta Omega Eta: founded at Trinity College in 2003.

Hartford campus

Long Walk buildings 

The first buildings completed on the current campus were Seabury and Jarvis halls in 1878. Together with Northam Towers, these make up what is known as the "Long Walk". These buildings are an early example of Collegiate Gothic architecture in the United States, built to plans drawn up by William Burges, with F.H. Kimball as supervising architect.  The Long Walk has been expanded and is connected with several other buildings.  On the northernmost end there is the chapel, whose western side is connected to the Downes and Williams Memorial building. Heading south, the next building is Jarvis Hall, named after Abraham Jarvis.  Jarvis becomes Northam Towers heading south, then Seabury Hall.  Seabury Hall, named for Samuel Seabury, is connected to Hamlin Hall.  To Hamlin's east is Cook, then Goodwin and then Woodward.  The dormitories on the Long Walk end there, and the terminal building on the south end of the long walk is Clement/Cinestudio.  Clement is the chemistry building; Cinestudio a student run movie theater. If one travels to the south of Hamlin there will be Mather Hall and the Dean of Students Office.

Chapel 

The Trinity College Chapel was built in the 1930s to replace Trinity's original chapel in Seabury Hall (now a lecture hall).  The chapel's facade is made almost entirely of limestone and connects to the adjacent Downes Memorial Clock Tower.  Its primary architect was Philip Hubert Frohman, of Frohman, Robb and Little, who were also responsible for the National Cathedral in Washington, D.C.

Main quadrangle 

Trinity's campus features a central green known as the Main Quad, designed by famed architect Frederick Law Olmsted. The large expanse of grass is bound on the west by the Long Walk, on the east by the Lower Long Walk, on the north by the chapel, and on the south by the Cook and Goodwin-Woodward dormitories. While a central green is a feature of many college campuses, Trinity's is notable for its unusually large, rectangular size, running the entire length of the Long Walk and with no walkways traversing it. Trees on the Quad have been planted in a 'T' configuration (for Trinity) with the letter's base at the statue of Bishop Brownell (built 1867).  and its top running the length of the Long Walk. Tradition holds that the trees were intended to distinguish Trinity's campus from Yale's.

The whole of Trinity's campus is set out on a  parcel of land that is bound on the south by New Britain Avenue, on the west by Summit Street, on the east by Broad Street, and on the north by Allen Place. Trinity's former northern border, Vernon Street, has been transferred from the city of Hartford to Trinity College and closed off at one end (Broad Street), creating a cul-de-sac within Trinity's borders. Completed in 2001, and on what was formerly an abandoned bus depot adjacent to Trinity's campus, the Learning Corridor is a collection of K-12 public magnet schools co-created by Trinity and the governments of Hartford and Connecticut.

Other important buildings on campus 

 Albert C. Jacobs Life Sciences Center – Built in 1967 in the architectural style of Brutalism, the Life Science Center, or LSC, was designed to be an abstract representation of the Long Walk. The building houses Trinity's departments of Biology and Psychology. It contains several classrooms, an auditorium, teaching labs, research labs, and a greenhouse. Trinity's first dedicated neuroscience lab is to be built in LSC in 2011. Fund raising is underway to construct a neuroscience suite and a music rehearsal hall on the north side of LSC.

 Austin Arts Center – The AAC was designed in the 1960s, and contains art exhibition spaces, two theaters (Garmany and Goodwin), a few classrooms, and is home to the offices of Theater and Dance and Music professors.
 Clement – The Clement Center, is home to the chemistry department. Clement contains four teaching laboratories, eight research laboratories, instrument rooms, computer rooms, and classrooms. It also offers its own library, conducive to scholarly pursuits and thoughtful concentration. During the summer of 2011, the building underwent a $750,000 renovation of five of its laboratories through funds provided by the National Science Foundation. Clement is also home to Cinestudio, the on campus movie theater.

 Chapel The Trinity College Chapel was built in 1933. It was designed by Frohman, Robb and Little, the same architects who designed the National Cathedral in Washington, D.C. The chapel is home to various religious services, as well as the service of Nine Lessons and Carols, a long-standing tradition at Trinity. The chapel is the tallest point in the city of Hartford.
 Facilities (formerly Buildings and Grounds)  The facilities building is the home of various departments that relate to the maintenance of the physical (as opposed to the academic) aspects of the college.  Included in this building is the Director of Facilities, the Superintendent of Grounds, the Superintendent of Construction Trades (who is also the Superintendent of Access Control), various engineers, electricians, painters, carpenters and mechanics.
 Ferris Athletic Center*- Ferris Athletic Center includes a field house, an eight-lane, 37-meter swimming pool with a movable bulkhead, 16 international-size squash courts, two basketball courts, 2 weight rooms (Rick and Anne Hazelton Fitness Center), one of which that is new and used for varsity team athletes, two crew tanks, a wrestling room and a 1/10-mile indoor track. It was named after George M. Ferris, who graduated Trinity. Adjacent to Ferris are 19 acres of playing fields for soccer, lacrosse, field hockey, and baseball as well as the  multi- purpose Robin L. Sheppard Field and the 6,500- seat Dan Jessee/Don Miller Football Field and Track.
 Jarvis Hall – This section of the Long Walk contains single, double and quad dorms, primarily for juniors and seniors.  It is rumored that the doubles were originally designed for students while the singles across the hallway were intended for their servants. In actuality, the single rooms were single bedrooms, which opened into living areas, which are currently the doubles and the hallway, and six rooms retain this layout. As of the 2008 school year, the massive Long Walk Reconstruction project has been completed, and the dorms are built in a classic style.
 Mather Hall – Just south of Hamlin Hall (the southern terminus of the long walk), Mather Hall is the main student center of Trinity College.  The building contains the main dining hall as well as "The Cave" dining hall, a post office and student mail boxes, a coffee house, as well as meeting rooms and large auditoriums. 
 Koeppel Community Sports Center – Completed in 2006, the $15.5 million center serves as Trinity's ice hockey arena. The Koeppel Center also serves as a recreational center for students and is open to the public. The Koeppel Center was given a prestigious design recognition as part of the "Facilities of Merit" awards in 2007.
 Roy Nutt Mathematics, Engineering & Computer Science Center –  is on the Life Sciences Quad (named for the Life Sciences Center, which dominates the eastern side of the quad) it is made of brick and sandstone. The Nutt Center was designed by renowned architect César Pelli.
 Northam Towers – This central tower on the Long Walk, flanked by the Fuller archway, connects Jarvis and Seabury Halls. The towers contain student housing. The National Fraternity of Alpha Chi Rho was founded in a room within Northam Towers.

 North Campus Hall – The largest dormitory on Trinity's campus was completed in 1958. The building has since been renovated various times, and spans the trajectory of two streets, from Vernon Street to Allen Place. It is a two-story building with long hallways and multiple common rooms.
 Raether Library and Information Technology Center – Trinity's main library was originally built at the southeast corner of the main quad in the 1950s to replace the library in Williams Memorial. Additional wings were constructed in the 1970s, and a major renovation took place in 2002, at which time the building was given its present name. The Watkinson Library, which houses rare books and manuscripts, occupies an annex of the first floor. Though a private academic library, more than 2,800 outside visitors were recorded between November 2006 and March 2007.

 Seabury Hall – This section of the Long Walk contains classrooms, professor's offices, and four dance studios. Its recent $32.7 million renovation project was completed in 2008.  In addition, the old Seabury chapel was renovated into a classroom, maintaining the pews for student seating.
 Trinity Commons * – on the south end of campus on New Britain and Summit St., Trinity Commons is the new arts mecca on campus. It contains 4 studio classrooms and the newly constructed Performance Lab. The Performance Lab is a massive black box theater that can sit at least 100 people, but can accommodate much more with standing room. It has a set lighting plot with about 100 lights and is the new performance venue for most new student and faculty shows. It also houses many offices on the other side of the building. It is one of the newest buildings on campus and only houses Theater and Dance classes and administrative offices.
 Vernon Social Center – Vernon Social Center, on Vernon Street, is a multipurpose auditorium used on campus for various events, including concerts and lectures. It is attached to Vernon Place, a dormitory, and makes up the quad housing North Campus Hall and High Rise Hall.

Contributions to the arts

Film

Cinestudio is an art cinema with 1930s-style design. An article in the Hartford Advocate described this non-profit organization, which depends solely on grants and the efforts of volunteer workers who are paid in free movies. Cinestudio has been in the Clement Chemistry Building since it was founded in the 1970s.

Music
Trinity also hosts the annual Trinity International Hip Hop Festival.  A three-day celebration of global hip hop culture, the festival features lectures, panel discussions, workshops and live performances.  The festival was founded in 2006 with the goal of unifying Trinity with the city of Hartford.

Since 2006, the station has broadcast the Trinity Samba Fest from the Hartford waterfront featuring regional and international talent.

Notable alumni 

Trinity College's distinguished alumni include many influential and historical people, including governors, US Cabinet members, federal judges, political commentators and journalists, and senior executives in business and industry.

Notable alumni of Trinity College include:

 Kristine Belson, Class of 1986, president of Sony Pictures Animation and Oscar-nominated film producer (The Croods)
 S. Prestley Blake, co-founder of Friendly's
 Joseph Buffington, judge, United States Court of Appeals for the Third Circuit
 Tucker Carlson, Class of 1991, political commentator, co-founder of The Daily Caller, host of Fox News Channel's Tucker Carlson Tonight, host of Fox Nation’s Tucker Carlson Today
 Tom Chappell, founder of Tom's of Maine
 Martin W. Clement, president of the Pennsylvania Railroad Company, 1935 to 1948. 
 Percival W. Clement, 57th Governor of Vermont
 Thomas R. DiBenedetto, president of Boston International Group, owner and former chairman of AS Roma
 David Gottesman, billionaire, founder of First Manhattan Co., and member of Berkshire Hathaway's board of directors
 Henry McBride, fourth Governor of Washington State
 Mary McCormack, actress (In Plain Sight, The West Wing). Her two siblings are also Trinity graduates. Bridget McCormack is Chief Justice of the Michigan Supreme Court, and Will McCormack is an actor.
 Mitchell M. Merin, former president and chief operating officer of Morgan Stanley Investment Management
 James Murren, chairman of the board and chief executive officer of MGM Resorts International
 Neil Patel, American lawyer, conservative political advisor to Vice President Dick Cheney, publisher and co-founder of The Daily Caller
Gregory Anthony Perdicaris, first U.S. Consul to Greece
 Charles R. Perrin, chairman of Warnaco, former chairman and CEO of Avon Products and of Duracell
 Rachel Platten, singer-songwriter
 William C. Richardson, board director of Exelon; former president of Johns Hopkins University
 Jane Swift, Class of 1987, former Governor of Massachusetts
 J. H. Hobart Ward, US Army general
 Jesse Watters, Class of 2001, conservative commentator, host of Jesse Watters Primetime, and co-host of The Five on Fox News
 John Williams, eleventh presiding bishop of the Episcopal Church in the United States
 Leo Wise (1849–1933), newspaper editor and publisher
 Charles C. Van Zandt, 34th Governor of Rhode Island

References

External links 
 
 
 Hartford, Connecticut: Landmarks~History~Neighborhoods | Trinity College
 

 
Education in Hartford, Connecticut
Educational institutions established in 1823
Liberal arts colleges in Connecticut
Universities and colleges in Hartford County, Connecticut
Tourist attractions in Hartford, Connecticut
Private universities and colleges in Connecticut